KZST (100.1 MHz) is a commercial FM radio station licensed to Santa Rosa, California, and serving Sonoma County.  It is owned by Redwood Empire Stereocasters and broadcasts an adult contemporary radio format, switching to Christmas music for much of November and December.  Evenings, it carries the nationally syndicated Delilah call in and request show.  KZST's radio studios and offices are on Mendocino Avenue in Santa Rosa.

KZST has an effective radiated power (ERP) of 6,000 watts.  The transmitter is off Mount Bennett Drive in Santa Rosa.  The station has two booster stations also broadcasting on 100.1 MHz:  KZST-1, 46 watts, is in Petaluma.  And 1,200 watt KZST-2 is in Rohnert Park.

History
On April 18, 1971, (the 65th anniversary of the Great earthquake) the station signed on the air.  That makes KZST "the first FM station between here (the San Francisco Bay Area) and Portland, Oregon."

Founded by Gordon Zlot, KZST remains under the ownership of his company, Redwood Empire Stereocasters.  In morning drive time, Brent Farris has broadcast his "Morning Showgram" for more than 25 years, the longest current tenure of any radio host in Sonoma County, with multiple co-hosts assisting him over that span of time. Jim Grady, the weekend morning host, held that distinction until March 26, 2004, when he was released from news/talk station KSRO after 44 years. KZST for a number of years aired two syndicated radio shows hosted by Dick Clark, Rock, Roll, and Remember was on Saturday nights, and Countdown America was on Sunday mornings.

"Jazzy 93.7" KJZY shares the same building and ownership.

In June 2022, it was announced that KZST and sister stations KWVF, K256DA, and K273CU would be acquired by Amaturo Sonoma Media Group for $6 million.  The deal was expected to close during the third quarter of 2022.

References

External links
Official website

Mass media in Sonoma County, California
ZST
Mass media in Santa Rosa, California